Pope Eusebius was the bishop of Rome from 18 April 310 until his death on 17 August 310. 

Difficulty arose, as in the case of his predecessor, Marcellus I, out of Eusebius's attitude toward the lapsi. Eusebius maintained the attitude of the Roman Church, adopted after the Decian persecutions (250–51), that the apostates should not be forever debarred from ecclesiastical communion, but readmitted after doing proper penance. This view was opposed by a faction of Christians in Rome under the leadership of Heraclius. Johann Peter Kirsch believes it likely that Heraclius was the chief of a party made up of apostates and their followers, who demanded immediate restoration to the Roman Church. Emperor Maxentius intervened and exiled them both.

Eusebius died in exile in Sicily very soon after being banished and was buried in the catacomb of Callixtus. Pope Damasus I placed an epitaph of eight hexameters over his tomb because of his firm defence of ecclesiastical discipline and the banishment which he suffered thereby. His feast is celebrated on 17 August. The feast had previously been observed on 26 September.

Notes

External links
 Opera Omnia

310 deaths
4th-century Christian saints
4th-century Romans
Greek popes
Papal saints
Popes
People from Sardinia
Year of birth unknown
4th-century popes
Ancient Roman exiles